Garvin Ferguson (born 11 March 1968) is a Bahamian swimmer. He competed in two events at the 1988 Summer Olympics.

References

External links
 

1968 births
Living people
Bahamian male swimmers
Olympic swimmers of the Bahamas
Swimmers at the 1988 Summer Olympics
Place of birth missing (living people)